is a Japanese idol, singer and actor. He is most known as a member of the Johnny's boyband Kis-My-Ft2. He appeared as an actor in multiple television series, including Mars Ta Da Kimi Wo Aishiteru.　On September １９－２１、he starred in a mini-series called バスケもこいも、していたい ("I Want To Do Basketball and Love").

Discography

Filmography

Films

Television dramas

Smartphone dramas 
  (May 8–28, 2012, NOTTV) — Masaki Kisaragi

References

External links 
 Kis-My-Ft2 profile — Johnny's Net
 Kis-My-Ft2 profile — Avex
 

1987 births
Living people
Johnny & Associates
Japanese idols
Japanese male pop singers
Musicians from Kanagawa Prefecture
21st-century Japanese singers
20th-century Japanese male actors
21st-century Japanese male actors
21st-century Japanese male singers